Raichel Bativakalolo (born 18 September 1997) is a Japanese rugby sevens player. She competed in the women's tournament at the 2020 Summer Olympics. She was born in Tokyo to a Fijian father and a Japanese mother.

References

External links
 

1997 births
Living people
Female rugby sevens players
Olympic rugby sevens players of Japan
Rugby sevens players at the 2020 Summer Olympics
Japanese people of Fijian descent
Sportspeople from Tokyo
Asian Games medalists in rugby union
Rugby union players at the 2018 Asian Games
Medalists at the 2018 Asian Games
Asian Games gold medalists for Japan
Japan international women's rugby sevens players